Dibenzylpiperazine (DBZP) is a piperazine derivative often found as an impurity in the recreational stimulant drug benzylpiperazine (BZP). Presence of DBZP is a marker for low quality or badly made BZP. It can be made as a reaction byproduct during BZP synthesis, either because the reaction has been run at too high a temperature, or because an excess of benzyl chloride has been used.

Pharmacology and effects
It is not known to have any stimulant effects in its own right, although this has not been tested.

Toxicity
The toxicity of DBZP is unknown.

Legal status

China

As of October 2015 DBZP is a controlled substance in China.

United States
DBZP is not scheduled as a controlled substance at the federal level in the United States. It is possible that it could be considered an analog BZP, in which case, sales or possession intended for human consumption could be prosecuted under the Federal Analog Act.

Florida
DBZP is a Schedule I controlled substance in the state of Florida making it illegal to buy, sell, or possess in Florida.

See also 
 Substituted piperazine

References 

Piperazines
Designer drugs
Benzyl compounds